Claudette May Holmes (born 1962) is a British photographer. Her work, which uses elements of montage and hand-colouring, has challenged stereoptypical representations of Black British people.

Life
Claudette Holmes was born in 1962 in Birmingham, England. In the early 1980s she worked in community arts in Birmingham. In 1982 she exhibited in Closing the Gap at the University of Aston and Herbert Art Gallery, Coventry.

In 1990 Holmes was among several female black and Asian photographers featured in the documentary Sistren in Photography. The 1993 exhibition From Negative Stereotype to Positive Image included her work alongside that of three other Birmingham photographers: Sir Benjamin Stone (1838–1914), Ernest Dyche (1887–1973) and Vanley Burke (born 1951). In 1996 she won the Chrissie Bailey Photography and Education Award.

Exhibitions
 Womanness, Wolverhampton Art Gallery, 1990. With Roshini Kempadoo.
 Sharp Voices, Still Lives, Birmingham Museum and Art Gallery, 1990.
 In Sight in View: Mozaix Black Visual Arts Poster Campaign. Various sites, 1990. With Nigel Madhoo, Roshini Kempadoo, Alvin Kelly, Maxine Walker and Said Adrus.
 Manipulated Images, Picture House, Leicester, 1992.
 Black British Photographers, Houston FotoFestival, Texas, 1992.
 The Critical Decade, Museum of Modern Art, Oxford, 1993.
 From Negative Stereotype to Positive Image, Birmingham Central Library, 1993. With Sir Benjamin Stone, Ernest Dyche

References

1962 births
Living people
20th-century British photographers
21st-century British photographers
Black British photographers
British women photographers
Photographers from Birmingham, West Midlands